Yuri Pershin (footballer, born 1986), Russian footballer
 Yuri Pershin (footballer, born 1999), Russian footballer